The Uberaba Formation is a Campanian geologic formation belonging to the Bauru Group of the Bauru Sub-basin, Paraná Basin located in Minas Gerais state of southeastern Brazil. The Uberaba Formation, intercalating the fossiliferous older Adamantina and younger Marília Formation, comprises limestones, sandstones, and conglomerates, often cemented by calcite with volcaniclastic sediments. The formation interfingers with the Adamantina Formation.

Dinosaur remains are among the fossils that have been recovered from the formation, although none have yet been referred to a specific genus. A megaraptoran similar to Aerosteon is known from the formation.

The crocodylomorph Uberabasuchus was described from the overlying Marília Formation.

See also 
 List of dinosaur-bearing rock formations
 List of stratigraphic units with indeterminate dinosaur fossils
 Campanian formations
 Anacleto Formation, contemporaneous Lagerstätte of the Neuquén Basin, Argentina
 Los Llanos Formation, contemporaneous ooliferous formation of the Sierra de Los Llanos, Argentina
 Lago Colhué Huapí Formation, contemporaneous fossiliferous formation of the Golfo San Jorge Basin, Argentina
 Cretaceous Brazil
 Vista Alegre crater, possibly Aptian impact crater in the Paraná Basin

References

Bibliography

Further reading 
 

Geologic formations of Brazil
Cretaceous Brazil
Campanian Stage
Upper Cretaceous Series of South America
Limestone formations
Sandstone formations
Conglomerate formations
Paleontology in Brazil
Formations
Formations